"Numb" is a song by English synth-pop duo Pet Shop Boys from their ninth studio album, Fundamental (2006). It was released on 15 October 2006 as the album's third and final single, peaking at number 23 on the UK Singles Chart. Up to that point, it was only the duo's second single in 39 releases to miss the UK top 20 (the other being "Was It Worth It?" from 1991, which peaked at number 24).

The ballad was widely used throughout the year, mainly in an edited version used in a montage for England's elimination from the 2006 FIFA World Cup on the BBC Match of the Day programme in early July 2006.

Background
Composed by Los Angeles songwriter Diane Warren, known for many commercial radio-friendly hits, "Numb" was originally procured by the Pet Shop Boys to be one of the new singles on the 2003 compilation PopArt: The Hits. The song was previously offered to rock band Aerosmith, whose song "I Don't Want to Miss a Thing" was written by Warren; it was rejected.

The reputations of the parties involved immediately suggested a stylistic clash; Warren's songs are often heavily emotive love songs (described by the band as the "Los Angeles ballad" style), while the Pet Shop Boys are characterized by largely synthetic sounds and Neil Tennant's restrained, dispassionate singing. This discontinuity was highlighted by Tennant's often-recounted anecdote of Warren offering the duo another song (still unrecorded to date) titled "Kisses on the Wind", which was flatly rejected due to its title.

Tennant discussed Warren's work in the BBC Radio 2 documentary Real Song: The Diane Warren Story, which was produced by Malcolm Prince in 2003. The series included Warren's own demo of "Numb".

Composition
Heavily orchestrated, with strings arranged by Trevor Horn, the song describes the desire to sequester oneself from the world due to traumatic experiences it has brought about; within the context of Fundamental, it has been observed that the song can be interpreted as a reaction to terrorism and the state of the world brought about in its aftermath.

The original demo is not orchestrated, relying instead on synthetic sounds. The newly remixed radio version edits out the orchestral opening and the entire second verse, and also repeats the dramatic bridge section, adding harmonized backing vocals the second time. (Despite this work, the music video plays to the original album version instead.)

Sleeve
The sleeve photography was taken by Sam Taylor-Wood. They show Pet Shop Boys wearing plague doctor masks that were bought in Venice, and were taken at the Jerusalem Tavern in Clerkenwell, London.

Music video
The music video for "Numb" was directed by Julian Gibbs, Julian House, and Chris Sayer, who, as reported by the band's official site, describe it as inspired by "Russian constructivist cinema". Gibbs had previously directed a 2005 BBC television adaptation of The Snow Queen, which Sayer worked on as animation director. In addition, the Gibbs and House pair have previously directed music videos for Primal Scream, Luke Slater, and Doves.

Release
The Pet Shop Boys official website announced the release of a new radio edit of "Numb" as the third single from Fundamental, accompanied by new songs "Party Song" and "Bright Young Things" as B-sides and a new remix of "Psychological" by Ewan Pearson to be included on the limited-edition 12-inch release.

"Bright Young Things" was recorded and written in 2003 with co-production by Chris Zippel. It was originally intended for a film of the same title made by Stephen Fry but film producers turned down the track. Neil Tennant stated in June 2006 on the official Pet Shop Boys website that it would be a B-side sometime soon.

The single package also includes a live version of "West End Girls", which was recorded by BBC Radio 2 at the Mermaid Theatre in May 2006. This live track is also featured on the Pet Shop Boys first live album, Concrete which was released the week following this single in October 2006.

The single peaked at number 23 on the UK Singles Chart, becoming the duo's second most unsuccessful single in terms of chart placement after "Was It Worth It?" (1991).

Track listings
UK CD single (CDR 6723)
"Numb" (new radio version) – 3:30
"West End Girls" (live at the Mermaid Theatre) – 4:55

UK CD maxi single (CDRS 6723)
"Numb" (PSB original demo) – 3:40
"Party Song" – 3:44
"Bright Young Things" – 4:57
"Numb" (music video) – 4:40
Tracks 2 and 3 on this release are reversed, making the track listing incorrect.
"Party song" includes elements of "That's the Way (I Like It)" by KC and the Sunshine Band.

UK limited-edition 7-inch single (R 6723)
A. "Numb" (new radio version) – 3:30
B. "Party Song" – 3:44

UK limited-edition 12-inch single (12R 6723)
A1. "Numb" (album version) – 4:44
A2. "Numb" (accapella) – 3:29
B. "Psychological" (Ewan Pearson mix) – 8:37

Charts

References

Further reading
 
 
 
 

2006 singles
2006 songs
Parlophone singles
Pet Shop Boys songs
Songs written by Diane Warren
Song recordings produced by Trevor Horn